There are nineteen official symbols of the US state of Minnesota, as designated by the Minnesota Legislature. The first named symbol is the state's motto, L'Étoile du Nord – French for "Star of the North". It was selected in 1861, shortly after Minnesota achieved statehood, by the first governor, Henry Sibley, as a reflection of Minnesota's location in the Northern United States. That same year, the state seal was appointed. Minnesota did not designate another official symbol until 1945, when "Hail! Minnesota", then the official song of the University of Minnesota, was designated as state song. In 1984, Minnesota became the first state to appoint a state mushroom, the common morel (Morchella esculenta).

Minnesota schoolchildren have been the force behind the successful promotion of four official symbols: the blueberry muffin (1988), the monarch butterfly (2000), the Honeycrisp apple (2006), and ice hockey (2009). The 1918 black-and-white photograph Grace, taken by Eric Enstrom in Bovey and later reproduced as a color painting by his daughter, was named state photograph in 2002. The newest symbol of Minnesota is the rusty patched bumblebee, declared the state bee in 2019. In addition, many other symbols have been proposed as representations of the state, but for various reasons have been unsuccessful. Suggested animals have included the white-tailed deer, the northern leopard frog, the eastern timber wolf, the thirteen-lined ground squirrel, and the Blanding's turtle. Through the years, the state legislature has also voted on unsuccessful bills to designate the Tilt-A-Whirl as official amusement ride, the works Little House on the Prairie and On the Banks of Plum Creek as state book, "Minnesota Blue" as official poem, as well as the appointment of a poet laureate position.

State symbols

Nicknames and unsuccessful proposals

Minnesota has three nicknames: "Land of 10,000 Lakes", which evolved from the desire of early settlers to advertise the state's large number of lakes to attract more people; "Gopher State", which was inspired by an early political cartoon criticizing the construction of several railroads in the mid-1800s; and "North Star State", a reference to both the state motto and Minnesota's position as the northernmost point in the contiguous United States. The Minnesota North Stars, the state's hockey team from 1967 to 1993, also derived its name from the state motto.

Many other symbols have been proposed for addition to the list of official state symbols but were never officially adopted. Since 1971, the white-tailed deer has been proposed as the state mammal eight times. Other creatures proposed as representations of the state have included the northern leopard frog, the eastern timber wolf, the thirteen-lined ground squirrel, and the Blanding's turtle. In 2007, another proposal, also unsuccessful, was to designate the Tilt-A-Whirl as the state's official amusement ride. It was invented in Faribault in 1926, and debuted at the Minnesota State Fair a year later.

In 2005, the state legislature overwhelmingly voted in favor of appointing a state poet laureate, a position offered by 34 other states. Governor Tim Pawlenty vetoed the measure, believing that the state could "benefit from the richness and diversity of all of the poets in Minnesota and recognize and embrace their work as merit and circumstances warrant." "Minnesota Blue", a 1985 poem by state native and poet-songwriter Cordell Keith Haugen, has been unsuccessfully proposed as state poem. Five other states have official poems. Proposals for state book have included two of Laura Ingalls Wilder's works, Little House on the Prairie and On the Banks of Plum Creek.

See also

History of Minnesota
Index of Minnesota-related articles
Outline of Minnesota

References

Works cited
 
 

Minnesota
Minnesota culture
Symbols